Abu Qasim  also known as Abdul Rahman (died 29 October 2015) was a Lashkar-e-Taiba commander and Pakistani national, who was mastermind behind 2015 Udhampur terrorist attack. He was killed on 29 October 2015 in the Kulgam area of Kashmir, in a joint operation by Jammu and Kashmir Police and the Indian Army. He was active in the Kashmir Valley since 2009 and  carried a cash reward of INR 20 lakh  on his head.

Qasim was a resident of Multan, Pakistan. He was head of the Lashkar-e-Toiba's operations in Kashmir, was its seniormost commander and top strategist, and the main recruiter, as reported by Indian Express.

See also 
 Lashkar-e-Taiba 
 2015 Udhampur terrorist attack

References

2015 deaths
Lashkar-e-Taiba members
Pakistani Islamists
Year of birth missing